The United Church Football Association was an Australian rules football competition based in the suburbs of Adelaide, South Australia from 1906 to 1977.

The competition was formed in April 1906 when delegates of some football clubs connected to churches in Adelaide met to establish a church association. The initial six clubs were Clayton Congregational, East Adelaide Methodist, Stanley Street Congregational, St Giles' Presbyterian, St Luke's Church of England, and St Mark's Church of England.

Stanley Shield 
The Stanley Shield was awarded to the champion team of the association from 1913. The shield was presented to the winner of a playoff between the A1 and A2 premiers. It was named after the Stanley Street team (later Thompson Memorial), which won three premierships in a row from 1910 to 1912.

Non A-Division/A1 Premiers in bold.

Premierships

Medallists

Moyes Medal 
The Moyes Medal (officially called the John Moyes Memorial Trophy), named after Mr John Moyes who had founded the association, was awarded to the best overall player in the association.

 1925 - A. Hamlyn 
 1926 - Burton (Prospect Methodist)
 1927 - C. Rowbotham (Thompson Memorial)
 1928 - H. Caller (Robert Street Church of Christ)
 1931 - S. P. Burton (Prospect Methodist)
 1934 - Tucker (Prospect Methodist)
 1935 - C. Young (Maylands Church of Christ)
 1938 - D. Bussell (Hindmarsh Baptist)
 1940 - R. Day (Hindmarsh Baptist)
 1971 - R. Lutze (Adelaide Lutheran)
 1972 - D. Menzel (Adelaide Lutheran)
 1975 - T. Parsons (Enfield Methodist)
 1976 - J. Birch (Ovingham Methodist)
 1977 - B. Miegel (Adelaide Lutheran)
McLennan Medal
 1976 - T. Parsons (Enfield Methodist)

Philps Medal (A-Division Medal) 

 1931 - G. Walton (Flinders Park Methodist)
 1935 - S. Chaplin (Manthorpe Memorial)
 1940 - R. Day (Hindmarsh Baptist)

Patron's Medal (B-Division Medal) 

 1925 - M Knight 
 1926 - Pastor W. Graham (Fullarton Church of Christ)
 1927 - R Lane (Clayton Congregational)
 1931 - L Kelton (Grote Street Church of Christ)
 1934 - Toseland (St Bartholomew's)
 1935 - DJ Cahill (St Patrick's)
 1938 - M Purdie (Prospect Church of Christ)
 1940 - J Turnbull (Ovingham Methodist)

C-Division Medal 

 1934 - Hall (Spicer and All Souls)
 1935 - C. Young (Maylands Church of Christ)
 1938 - Wilson (Maylands Church of Christ)
 1940 - W. Matthews (Maylands Church of Christ)

Patron's Medal (D-Division Medal) 

 1934 - Lyons (St Giles')
 1938 - Kinter (Mile End Church of Christ)
 1940 - D. Reddin (Parkside West Methodist)

Member Clubs

References 

1906 establishments in Australia
1977 disestablishments in Australia
Defunct Australian rules football competitions in South Australia